Senator Romero may refer to:

Craig Romero (born 1954), Louisiana State Senate
Gloria Romero (politician) (born 1955), California State Senate
Richard M. Romero (born 1944), New Mexico State Senate
Ross I. Romero (born 1971), Utah State Senate

See also
Senator Romer (disambiguation)